The Shaggy cusk (Porocephalichthys dasyrhynchus) is a species of viviparous brotula found in reefs around Rottnest Island, Western Australia.  This species grows to a length of  SL.  This is the only known species in its genus.  This species, while uncommon, is not considered to be at any risk.

References
 

Bythitidae
Monotypic fish genera
Fish described in 1982